Mina language may refer to:
Mina language (Cameroon), also known as Hina and Besleri
Mina language (Togo), also known as Gen
Mina language (India), spurious